Gladiators: Springbok Challenge 1 was the first Springbok Challenge series for South African Gladiators and UK Gladiators.

Contenders

Gladiators

Episodes

References

Gladiators (franchise)